Mount Ross Cox is located on the border of Alberta and British Columbia. It was named in 1920 after Ross Cox who traveled the area in 1817.

See also
 List of peaks on the Alberta–British Columbia border
 Mountains of Alberta
 Mountains of British Columbia

References

Ross Cox
Ross Cox
Ross Cox